An artwork title is a word or phrase used to identify and distinguish a particular work of art from others. These titles can be descriptive, indicative of the content or theme of the work, or they can be more abstract and open to interpretation. Such titles can be designated by the artists themselves, or by curators or other third parties, and can affect reception and interpretation.

History and curation
Artworks were not typically given a proper title in the ancient world, the identification of something like a cult image being self-evident in a particular sociocultural context, akin to the concept of the Poor Man's Bible. They were sometimes inscribed by epigraphy with the signature of the artist and/or the subject of the piece such as a titulus, but this was not a true title. Subsequent art history, beginning with Pliny's chapters that gave common names to works such as by Praxiteles and continuing to scholarship of medieval Christian art and that of non-Western cultures, tends to refer to religious works after the epithets or iconography of figures or events depicted in the piece. Proper titles as such only emerged in a Western context in the 18th century, with Enlightenment cataloging of the first museums and the first exhibitions.

In modern times, titles of artworks are often chosen by the artist, but they can also have been assigned by galleries, private collectors, printmakers, art dealers, or curators, this historical process being the subject of a book by Ruth Yeazell. The onomastician Adrian Room compiled an encyclopedic dictionary in this area. John C. Welchman has written Invisible Colors as a critical history of modern titles, after an aphorism by Duchamp.

Some artworks have had their museum label names changed as new art history research emerges or as a modification of an offensive or pejorative name. Curating institutions are responsible for thorough documentation of all title variants, including translations of an artwork title into one or more languages. As a proper title is considered the default for modern works, others may be designated "Untitled" (by secondary sources or by the artist as a conscious choice), and are sometimes also assigned a parenthetical name for clarity.

From Gustave Courbet's L'Origine du monde (1866), to Marcel Duchamp's Fountain (1916) and L.H.O.O.Q. (1919), to Freytag-Loringhoven and Schamberg's God 1917, to Maurizio Cattelan's America (2016), artists have used artwork titles to provide additional meaning and/or context to their works of art since at least the 19th century.

Art criticism 
The title of a work of art can have an impact on its reception and aesthetic interpretation by audiences and critics, and can also be an aspect of the artist's overall vision for the piece, and this can be particularly the case for abstract art. Some artists choose to title their works with a simple descriptive phrase, such as "Portrait of a Woman" or "Landscape with Trees." Other artists may use more abstract or symbolic titles, such as The Scream or The Persistence of Memory. In some cases, the title of a work of art may be a quote or homage to another work of art or literature. Conversely, ekphrastic literature often repurposes the title of an artwork.

The choice of title for a work of art, akin to an artist's statement, can be a personal decision for the artist, and can reflect their own interpretation or intentions for the piece. It can also serve as a way for the artist to engage with the viewer and invite them to consider the work from a particular perspective. Philosophically, Jacques Derrida compared an artwork's title to a parergon and considered it similarly to a simulacrum, and Jean-Luc Nancy took a comparable approach. The title of a work of art is a part of its identity and can influence its reception and interpretation by audiences, as noted by art critic Arthur Danto, who made a thought experiment of a particular abstract mural being named after either the first or third of Newton's laws of motion; however, titles can be more impactful on the interpretation of some works than others. Whether descriptive or abstract, the title of a work of art can be an element of the artistic process.

See also
List of artworks known in English by a foreign title

References

Art history
Interpretation (philosophy)
Museology
Names
Works of art
Visual arts media
Concepts in aesthetics
Titles